Lawrence Andrew "Drew" Hayes (July 20, 1969 – March 21, 2007) was a writer and graphic artist who is best known as the creator of the long-running independent comic book series Poison Elves .

Hayes began self-publishing I, Lusiphur under the Mulehide Graphics imprint in 1991. He changed the series title to Poison Elves with #8, and continued through #20. During this period, he was a prominent example of creators distributing their black and white comics to the direct market. In 1995 he signed a "lifetime contract" assigning the rights to the series to Sirius Entertainment, where he produced another 79 issues and a color special, the last of which was published in September 2004. His work has been collected in Twelve Poison Elves paperbacks. He engaged in an ongoing mock "feud" with fellow comics creator Brian Bendis in the letters pages of their books.

Hayes suffered from health problems which hampered his ability to create comics. He was overweight, had suffered cardiac damage from sleep apnea, and had been hospitalized more than once. After undergoing treatment in the hospital and losing weight, he planned to resume creating new issues of Poison Elves, but died at the age of 37, of a heart attack while suffering from pneumonia.

Works

Deaththreats,The Life and Times of a Comic Book Rock Star
Sirius Entertainment, 2009, 384 pages, .
Collects all 100 of the Starting Notes from Poison Elves (annotated and illustrated to provide context), as well as extended excerpts from Drew's Deathreats letter columns.

Poison Elves comics
 I, Lusiphur/Poison Elves
 Poison Elves Overstreet Fan Edition
 Lusipher and Lirilith
 Requiem for an Elf
 Traumatic Dogs
 Desert of the Third Sin 
 Patrons
 The Mulehide Years (collection of vol 1–4)
 Sanctuary
 Guild War
 Salvation
 Rogues

Other art
 "Season in the Sun" (poster)
 "The Pub Scene" (color print)
 "Hyena" (B&W print)
 "Dryad" (color print)
 "Cover Prints" 
 "Strange Attractors/Poison Elves Jam Poster" – with Michael Cohen.
 Poison Elves T-shirts (four different designs)
 Poison Elves Limited Edition Portfolio I – A set of six plates reprinting covers from Mulehide issues of the comic and a new plate. 
 Poison Elves trading cards

Art in other comics
 Hunters printed in Elfquest—Hidden Years, #10, Blood of Ten Chiefs #4, and New Blood #13.
 Necromancer #3
 Moon Marauders (pinup )
 Strange Attractors #6-#8 (coloring for the cover art)
 Drew Fiend's Rare Bit Haze (appears in Roarin' Rick's Rare Bit Fiends #5)
 G.A.S.P. contains excerpt from Poison Elves #17
 Indy #10 for interview with Dan DeBono (cover art with Barry Blair)
 Wandering Star #9 (pinup art)
 Overstreet's Fan #7 (illustration of Lusiphur on the cover.)
 Overstreet's Fan #10 (cover art)
 The Crow (appears in Mythography #1)

Miscellaneous art
 "Lady Death Chromium II" (Card #64)
 "Strangers in Paradise Card Set" (Card #76)

References

Further reading

1969 births
2007 deaths
American comics artists
Underground cartoonists
American comics writers